Post Records is an American independent record label, which was formed by Buzz Curtis in the early 1960s. It is located in Philadelphia, Pennsylvania. Curtis pressed many such compilations in the 1960s and 1970s. Most would contain one or two localized hits. Both volumes of CKLW Solid Gold were American LPs, pressed by Post Records.

Discography
POST-10 - WCFL Double Gold (2xLP)
POST-22 - WIBG 22 Big Goldens
POST-30 - WIBG Presents 30 Big Goldens
POST-68 - WRKO 30 Now Goldens
POST-316- KLEO 22 Heavy Goldens
POST-560 - WQAM The Roarin' 30 Album
POST-610 - KILT Double Gold
POST-747 - WRKO 30 Now Goldens Vol.2
POST-950 - WBBF 22 Golden Oldies
POST 987 - WOR-FM 98.7 Double Golden 1968
POST 7001 - WOR-FM 98.7 Solid Gold Double Album 1970
POST-7102 - WIFE 22 Golden Classics
POST-7103 - KOIL 22 Golden Classics
POST-9660 - Bits Of Buzz And Patti Volume 1
The following were POST releases of Coed material.  Although listed as stereo, they were re-channeled stereo even though the Coed recordings were in stereo.
POST-1000 - The Duprees Sing, late-1960s
POST-2000 - The Rivieras Sing, late-1960s
POST-4000 - The Shangri-Las Sing, late-1960s
POST-3000 - The Crests Sing, late-1960s
POST-5000-C - Lee Andrews Sings
POST-6000-C - The Beau Brummels Sing, late-1960s
POST-7000 - Jerry Butler Sings, late-1960s
POST-8000 - The Olympics Sing
POST-9000 - Del Shannon Sings
POST-11000 - The Duprees Sing, Volume 2, early-1970s

Produced by Buzz Curtis:
 POST-8 - CKLW - Solid Gold (2xLP)
 POST-7108 - CKLW Solid Gold, Vol. 2 (2xLP)
 30 Now Goldens (2xLP, Comp) – Post Records — 1968
 WSAI Command Performance (2xLP, Comp) – Post Records — 1970
 93/KHJ: "Sound Of The Sixties" (2xLP) – Pace Records — 1970
 The Duprees Sing (LP) – Post Records
 WIBG: 30 Big Goldens (2xLP, Comp) – Post Records
 POST-7108 – CKLW – Solid Gold (2xLP)
 KLIV Super 16 Hits (LP, Comp) – Post Records

References

American record labels